Stein Ringen (born July 5, 1945) is a Norwegian sociologist and political scientist. He is Professor of Sociology and Social Policy at the Department of Social Policy and Intervention, University of Oxford, and a Fellow of Green Templeton College, Oxford (formerly Green College, Oxford).

Early life and education
Ringen holds a magister degree in political science (a 7-year degree including 3 years of research) from the University of Oslo (1972) and a dr. philos. degree from the University of Oslo (1987).

Career
He has been a Visiting Professor at Université de Paris I - Panthéon Sorbonne (1995, 1996), École Normale Supérieure de Cachan (1996-1997), Masaryk University (2003), Charles University (2003), University of the West Indies (2004, 2006) and Wissenschaftszentrum Berlin für Sozialforschung (2006).

He has written several books in Norwegian and English. He is also a regular contributor to Norwegian public debate.

Books
2016: The Perfect Dictatorship: China in the 21st Century
2013: Nation of Devils: Democratic Leadership and the Problem of Obedience, Yale Univ. Press
2009: The Economic Consequences of Mr Brown
2007: What Democracy Is For
2006: The Possibility of Politics (new edition)
2005: Citizens, Families, and Reform (new edition)
2004: Norges nye befolkning
2000: Veien til det gode liv'''
1999: Ordet som er (co-author)
1998: The Family in Question1997: ReformdemokratietViews on modern China

In his latest book The Perfect Dictatorship: China in the 21st Century,'' Ringen provides insights that explain how China's authoritarian system works and where the party-state may be moving.  

By pointing out Chinese Communist Party's priorities, i.e, self-preservation, stability and economic growth, Ringen argues that what concerns Party the most is the lack of political legitimacy.

Ringen creates a word "controlocracy" to describe Party's governance through censorship and stability management etc. It does not depend on commanding most people in their daily lives and is able to mostly rely on their acquiescence and self-censorship.

Ringen also believes that China's achievement is overestimated because of its bigness.

From Ringen's point of view, "China Dream" is a dangerous ideology promoted by the Party because it makes national greatness and individual happiness inseparable. 

Based on the fact that China's economic growth is slowing down and social freedom is deteriorating, Ringen predicts that China may become a new Nazi state under Communist Party's consolidating power and absolute rule.

References

Further reading
 Faith in freedom (2011)—article

External links

External link

Norwegian sociologists
Fellows of Green Templeton College, Oxford
Academics of the University of Oxford
Academic staff of the University of Paris
1945 births
Living people